An ancestor is a progenitor from which individuals or groups are descended.

Ancestor, ancestors, or ancestry may also refer to:

Film, TV, and games
The Ancestor, a 1936 Italian film
Ancestors (TV series), a public television mini-series on family history
The Ancestors (Stargate)
 Ancestors: The Humankind Odyssey, a video game developed by Panache Digital Games

Music
Ancestors (band), a metal band from Los Angeles, California
Ancestors (Renee Rosnes album), 1995
Ancestors (Mario Pavone album), 2008
Ancestors (Wadada Leo Smith album), 2012
Ancestors (EP), a 1997 EP by Edith Frost
The Ancestors, an album by Tim Berne
"Ancestress" (song), a 2022 song by Björk

Other uses
Ancestor (sculpture), a 1965 public sculpture in Madison, Wisconsin
Ancestor (novel), a 2006 novel by Scott Sigler

See also
Ancestry.com, a genealogy website
 Descendant (disambiguation)
 Primitive (disambiguation)
 Progenitor